John McIntyre (born 10 March 1977) is a New Zealand racecar driver who competes in the V8SuperTourer championship and is a co-driver for Ford Performance Racing in the V8 Supercar Series at Sandown and Bathurst.

NZV8's
Hawke's Bay-born John McIntyre started in the NZV8s (aka New Zealand V8 Touring Cars) in 1996.
In 2006 he debuted his own team John McIntyre Racing and won the 2006–07 championship. McIntyre and his team successfully defended their championship title in the 2007–08 season, proving themselves a dominant force in New Zealand motorsport.

McIntyre wrapped up his competition in the NZV8s with a final championship title in 2011 (http://www.v8.co.nz/news-3900/mcintyre-takes-2011-title-in-nz-v8-champs) before moving to the then-new V8SuperTourers.

Achievements

1990
First minor to race on a permanent racing track in NZ (Manfeild aged 13)

1992
Shell Ultra Challenge Scholarship Winner (aged 15)

1993
New Zealand Motor Sports person of the year (Junior Male)

1994
Youngest ever race winner at the Wellington Street Race (Nissan GT Cup aged 17)

1996
Nissan GT Cup Series Champion

1997
7th TraNZam Light Championship (contesting 57% of rounds), 2 wins, 4 seconds, 6 pole positions

2000
5th NZ V8 Touring Car Championship, 1 win, 7 top five finishes, 2 fastest laps

2001
Winner of the Liquor King 500 Endurance Race for TKR at Ruapuna Raceway
Winner of Round 5 NZ V8 Touring Car Championship at Manfeild NZ

2002
Debut V8 Supercar drive, driving for Team Kiwi Racing at Willowbank Raceway, Qld Australia finishing 22nd with Jason Richards

2003
Pole Position, Race 1 Winner at Winton, Vic Australia driving Corvette TraNZam
Winner of the Manfeild 4 Hour Endurance Race driving Sierra Cosworth
First race win in Australia at Philip Island Vic driving a Corvette TraNZam on debut
3rd NZ V8 Touring Car Championship for Team Kiwi Racing

2004–2005
3rd NZV8 Touring Car Championship
18th at Indy 300 V8 Supercar Championship, sprint round debut for WPS Racing
Debut at Bathurst 1000 driving with David Besnard, DNF Engine while in the top 10
21st V8 Supercar Sandown 500 driving for WPS Racing with Alex Yoong
Winner of the Manfeild 4 Hour Endurance Race (2nd year running) driving an Audi RS4
Lap Record at Manfeild
5th Trans-Tasman Porsche GT3 Cup

2006
1st Group N (1600–2000cc) 24 Hours Nurburgring (Germany)
6th NZV8 Touring Car Championship
5th V8 Brutes Sandown 500 on debut
6th Pukekohe 6 Hour Endurance Race
4th Manfeild 4 Hour Endurance Race

2007
Team Kiwi Racing Endurance driver – Sandown and Bathurst
Jim Clark Trophy winner 2007
Winner of the NZV8s Championship
Closest win in NZV8 History (0.024)
Awarded Presidents Scholarship for session with neuroscientist Kerry Spackman
Recipient of the Ernie Sprague Memorial Trophy at Timaru

2008
New Zealand Gold Star Champion – JMR Ford Falcon
1st NZV8 Championship – JMR Ford Falcon

2009
 New Zealand Gold Star Champion – JMR Ford Falcon
 2nd NZV8 Championship – JMR Ford Falcon

2010
	
 2nd V8 Supercars Gold Coast 600 – Gold Coast – SBR Falcon
 3rd V8 Supercars Gold Coast 600 – Gold Coast – SBR Falcon
	2nd NZV8 Championship – 10 Race Wins – JMR Ford Falcon
	1st NZV8 3 Race Wins – Round Win – ITM 400 Hamilton Street Race – JMR Ford Falcon

2011
	6th V8 Supercars Bathurst 1000 – Mount Panorama – SBR Falcon
	5th V8 Supercars Phillip Island 500 – Phillip Island – SBR Falcon
	New Zealand Gold Star Champion (3rd) – JMR Ford Falcon
	1st NZV8 Championship (3rd) – 9 Race Wins – JMR Ford Falcon
	1st NZV8 Championship Final – Pole Position – 3 Race Wins – Round Win – ITM 400 Hamilton Street Race – JMR Ford Falcon

2012
	3rd Overall V8 SuperTourers Championship – JMR Ford Falcon
	1st V8 SuperTourers Sprint Championship – JMR Ford Falcon
	Pole Position (co-driver) V8 Supercar Bathurst 1000 – FPR Falcon
	1 Feature Race Win and 7 Podiums V8 SuperTourers Championship – JMR Ford Falcon

2013

	10th Overall 101 GT Endurance Race Highlands Motorsport Park – Porsche GT3 997
	1st NZV8 Championship Final – Pole Position – 2 Wins – Round Win ITM 400 – Pukekohe Park Raceway (62x NZV8 Race Wins)
	3rd Overall Round 4 South Island Endurance Series – Highlands Motorsport Park – Porsche GT3 997
	Pole Position and 1st Overall Round 1 South Island Endurance Series – Teretonga Park – Porsche GT3 997
	13th V8 Supercars Bathurst 1000 – Mount Panorama – Team Jeldwen FPR Falcon
	2x Podiums V8 SuperTourers Championship – JMR Ford Falcon

2014

	5th NZ SuperTourers Endurance Series
	Pole Position and 6th Overall Round 3 North Island Endurance Series – Hampton Downs – Porsche GT3 997
	2nd Overall Round 2 North Island Endurance Series – Taupo Motorsport Park – Porsche GT3 997

2015
	1st overall North Island Endurance Series 3 Hour
	Pole position and 1st overall North Island Endurance Series 3 Hour – Pukekohe
	Pole position and 1st overall North Island Endurance Series 3 Hour – Hampton Downs
	2nd overall North Island Endurance Series 3 Hour – Taupo
	Qualified 16th Bathurst 12 Hour – Trass Family Motorsport Ferrari 458 Fia GT3 spec
2016
	NZ 3 Hour Endurance Racing Champion – Hampton Downs 12 March – Driving with Inky Tulloch
	2nd Overall South Island Endurance Series 3 Hour – driving with Simon Gilbertson
	Pole Position and 2nd Place South Island Endurance Series 3 Hour – Timaru
	Pole Position and 4th Place South Island Endurance Series 3 Hour – Ruapuna
	Pole Position and 2nd Place South Island Endurance Series 3 Hour – Teretonga (new outright Saloon Car Lap Record)
	3rd Overall North Island Endurance Series 3 Hour – Driving with Simon Gilbertson
	3rd Place North Island Endurance Series 3 Hour – Hampton Downs
	Pole Position and 1st Place North Island Endurance Series 3 Hour – Taupo

2017

	Pole Position and 2nd Place NZ 3 Hour Endurance Championship – Ruapuna 18 March – Driving with Mark Gibson
	2nd Place South Island Endurance Series – Timaru – with Simon Gilbertson Porsche 991 M

2018
	1st Overall North Island Endurance Series – with Simon Gilbertson Porsche 991 MR
	2nd Place North Island Endurance Series – Manfeild – with Simon Gilbertson Porsche 991 MR
	1st Place North Island Endurance Series – Hampton Downs – with Simon Gilbertson Porsche 991 MR

Complete Bathurst 1000 results

References

New Zealand racing drivers
Supercars Championship drivers
Sportspeople from Hastings, New Zealand
1977 births
Living people
Toyota Racing Series drivers
V8SuperTourer drivers
Stone Brothers Racing drivers
Nürburgring 24 Hours drivers